Fairvale may refer to:
 Fairvale High School, an educational high school located on the border of Fairfield West and Canley Vale in Sydney, Australia
 Fairvale, New Brunswick, an incorporated village in Kings County, New Brunswick, Canada
 Fairvale, California, a fictional place near where the Bates Motel is situated in the Alfred Hitchcock's film Psycho (also see Psycho House)